William Stephen Byrne (born 19 April 1958) is an Australian Labor politician who was elected to represent Rockhampton in the Legislative Assembly of Queensland at the 2012 state election. He served until his retirement due to ill health in 2017.

His party was heavily defeated at the 2012 election and Byrne was one of seven ALP members of the Legislative Assembly returned at that election.

Of the seven ALP members returned at the general election, Byrne was the only one new to the Legislative Assembly although Jackie Trad was soon elected in South Brisbane replacing former Premier Anna Bligh who resigned immediately after the election defeat.

After Labor's victory in the 2015 Queensland state election, he was sworn in as Minister for Agriculture and Fisheries and Minister for Sport and Racing in the Palaszczuk Ministry on 16 February 2015.

In December 2015, Byrne's portfolio in the Palaszczuk Ministry changed when he became the new Minister for Police, Fire and Emergency Services and the new Minister for Corrective Services. He regained the Agriculture and Fisheries portfolio and was given the new ministry of Regional Economic Development in a November 2016 reshuffle.

In February 2016, the state opposition called for an investigation into Byrne under firearms laws after he admitted to using a rifle to shoot rats at his home twenty years earlier.

On 7 October 2017, Byrne announced that he had resigned from the Queensland Cabinet as Minister for Agriculture and Fisheries and Minister for Rural Economic Development, and that he would not be contesting the next election. He cited a serious and "life threatening" health issue as the reason for his retirement.

References

1958 births
Living people
Members of the Queensland Legislative Assembly
Australian Labor Party members of the Parliament of Queensland
Australian Army officers
21st-century Australian politicians